Nirmiti Sawant is a Marathi actress, who mainly acts in Marathi films, television and dramas. She became popular after her performance in daily TV soap Kumari Gangubai Non-Matric along with Pandharinath Kamble. This was followed by a series of films and theatre performances, which added to her repertoire and have increased her popularity in the Marathi film and theatre industry. She is also known for her comedy play Jau Bai Jorat. She was one of the judges for the comedy reality show Fu Bai Fu on Zee Marathi TV channel. She was previously working on 1760 Sasubai for ETV Marathi TV channel. She was last seen on Jadubai Jorat which aired on Zee Marathi.

Filmography

TV serials
 Kumari Gangubai Non Matric
 Constable Kamana Kamtekar
 Hapta Band as Host
 Kitchen Kallakar as Judge
 Jadubai Jorat 
 1760 Sasubai
 Tu Tu Main Main
 Fu Bai Fu as Judge
 Bigg Boss Marathi 3 as guest
 Bus Bai Bas Ladies Special as guest

Plays
 Jau Baai Jorat
 Chuk Bhul Dyavi Ghyavi
 Shree Swami Samarth
 Kumari Gangubai Metric
 Shyamchi Mummy
 Vacuum Cleaner
 Sanjya Chhaya

References

External links
 
 Interview

Indian television actresses
1951 births
Living people
Actresses from Mumbai
20th-century Indian actresses
21st-century Indian actresses